Tippo is an unincorporated community located in Tallahatchie County, Mississippi, United States, located approximately  from Swan Lake;  northeast of Glendora; and approximately  from Charleston. Tippo is located at the intersection of Tippo and Sharkey roads.

Tippo has a post office with ZIP code 38962.

The community is named after Tippo Bayou.

Education
Tippo is in the East Tallahatchie School District. Charleston High School is the area high school.

Coahoma Community College is the designated community college.

Notable person
Mose Allison, Blues musician

Gallery

References

Unincorporated communities in Tallahatchie County, Mississippi
Unincorporated communities in Mississippi
Mississippi placenames of Native American origin